Red Envelope Entertainment (originally Netflix First) was a film production unit created by Netflix in 2006. The studio produced independent content for the company's  DVD-by-mail service. The company produced and/or distributed over 100 films, before ultimately being closed in 2008. The firm cited the closure of the production division, as a result of pressure from partnered film studios, which were competing for rights.

In 2012, Netflix returned to producing original content under its own banner.

Films distributed
2 Days In Paris
4 Months, 3 Weeks And 2 Days
Born into Brothels
Dandelion
Hopeless Pictures
I'm Reed Fish
Love Songs
Maxed Out
Nice Guys Sleep Alone
Open Hearts
Puccini for Beginners
The Puffy Chair
Super High Me
This Film is Not Yet Rated
This Filthy World
Trumbo
An Unreasonable Man
Sherrybaby
Zach Galifianakis Live at the Purple Onion

References

Defunct film and television production companies of the United States
Netflix
American companies established in 2006
American companies disestablished in 2008
Entertainment companies established in 2006
Entertainment companies disestablished in 2008
Mass media companies established in 2006
Mass media companies disestablished in 2008